Anne-Marie Nielsen (born 11 July 1941) is a retired Danish handball player and coach. Between January 1959 and December 1975 she played 180 international matches and scored 301 goals. From June 1960 to November 1973 she took part in all 133 matches of the national team, which remains the longest series in Danish history. Nielsen won silver medals at the 1962 World Championships and 1962–1963 European Champions Cup, as well as 10 national titles.

References

1941 births
Living people
Danish female handball players